Orange County most commonly refers to:

Orange County, California, part of the Los Angeles metropolitan area

Orange County may also refer to:

U.S. counties
Orange County, Florida, containing Orlando
Orange County, Indiana 
Orange County, New York, part of the Hudson Valley area
Orange County, North Carolina
Orange County, Texas 
Orange County, Vermont
Orange County, Virginia

Other uses
Orange County (film), 2002 film set in Orange County, California
County of Orange, a feudal state of The Holy Roman Empire from c. 800 to 1163, later the Principality of Orange
Orange County Choppers, American motorbike manufacturer
Alexander James O'Connor, known professionally as "Rex Orange County"
Ju Jun, also known as "Orange County", an American-style suburb near Beijing, China

See also
Orange County Airport (disambiguation)
Orange County SC, an association football club based in Irvine, California
Orang County, North Hamgyŏng, North Korea
The O.C., television show named after Orange County, California

United States county name disambiguation pages